Argenteuil is a commune in the northwestern suburbs of Paris, France. Argenteuil is a sub-prefecture of the Val-d'Oise department, the seat of the arrondissement of Argenteuil. Argenteuil is part of the Métropole du Grand Paris.

Argenteuil is the fourth most populous commune in the suburbs of Paris (after Boulogne-Billancourt, Saint-Denis, and Montreuil) and the most populous one in the Val-d'Oise department, although it is not its prefecture, which is shared between the communes of Cergy and Pontoise.

Argenteuil shares borders with communes in 3 departements others than Val d'Oise : the Yvelines, Hauts-de-Seine and Seine-Saint-Denis departements.

Name
The name Argenteuil is recorded for the first time in a royal charter of 697 as Argentoialum, from a Latin/Gaulish root argento meaning "silver", "silvery", "shiny", perhaps in reference to the gleaming surface of the river Seine, on the banks of which Argenteuil is located, and from a Gaulish language suffix -ialo meaning "clearing, glade" or "place of".

History
Argenteuil was founded as a convent in the 7th century (see Pierre Abélard and the Convent of Argenteuil). The monastery that arose from the convent was later destroyed during the French Revolution.

A rural escape for Parisians, it is now a suburb of Paris. Painters made Argenteuil famous, including Claude Monet, Eugène Delacroix, Auguste Renoir, Gustave Caillebotte, Alfred Sisley and Georges Braque.

Transport
Argenteuil is served by two stations on the Transilien Paris-Saint-Lazare suburban rail line, which are Argenteuil and Val d'Argenteuil.

Since redeveloped by STIF and SNCF, Argenteuil has been equipped with the new Paris-Saint-Lazare-Ermont-Eaubonne line. The new line was launched in 2006, adding the Paris-Saint Lazare / Cormeilles-en-Parisis - Pontoise / Mantes-la-Jolie service to Paris for about ten minutes.

By Bus* :

361 Gare d'Argenteuil à Gare de Pierrefitte - Stains RER;

140 Gare d'Argenteuil - Asnières-Gennevilliers - Gabriel Péri;

164 Argenteuil - Claude Monet College - Porte de Champerret;

By train* :

Gare d'Argenteuil (SNCF-J): Paris Saint-Lazare in 15 minutes and Colombes in 4 minutes

Gare Saint-Gratien (T-8): Porte Maillot in 22 minutes

Épinay Orgemont (T-8): Gare Saint-Denis in 20 minutes

Travel by car:

City centre: 10 minutes;

Paris Saint-Lazare: 25 minutes

La Défense: 20 minutes;

Colombes: 10 minutes;

la Plaine-Saint-Denis: 18 minutes;

Porte de Clichy: 15 minutes;

Education
, the commune's schools have over 12,000 students. The commune has:
 30 public preschools (maternelles) and one private elementary school with a preschool
 26 public and 2 private elementary schools
 11 junior high schools (collèges) - 10 public and 1 private
 6 senior high schools/sixth-form colleges:
 Lycée Georges Braque
 Lycée Cognacq-Jay
 Lycée Julie-Victoire Daubié
 Lycée Jean Jaurès
 Lycée Fernand et Nadia Léger
 Ecole nationale des professions de l'automobile  (private)

Paris 13 University serves as the area university.

The Conservatoire à rayonnement départemental de Musique, Danse et Théâtre is located in Argenteuil. André Bon is one of its former students.

Population

Immigration

Twin towns – sister cities

Argenteuil is twinned with:
 Alessandria, Italy
 Dessau-Roßlau, Germany
 Hunedoara, Romania
 West Dunbartonshire, Scotland, United Kingdom

Notable people
Héloïse (c. 1100/01 – 1163/64),  nun, philosopher and writer
Charles Longuet (1839–1903, journalist and socialist activist
Claude Monet (1840–1926), painter, lived and worked here in 1871–1878
Georges Braque (1882–1963), painter, sculptor and co-founder of cubism
Sidney Duteil (born 1955), musician and television host
Ingrid Chauvin (born 1971), actress
Thomas Henry (born 1994), professional footballer
Franck Béria (born 1983), retired professional footballer and functionary
Ibrahim Gary (born 1985), karateka
Fabien Ateba (born 1991), basketball player
Kevin Mayer (born 1992), athlete, Olympic medalist
Cécile Pelous, philanthropist and designer

Famous paintings of Argenteuil

By Claude Monet:

Autumn at Argenteuil, Regatta at Argenteuil, Red Boats, Argenteuil, The Bridge at Argenteuil, The Port at Argenteuil, The Seine at Argenteuil, View of Argenteuil-Snow, Bords de la Seine a Argenteuil, and Snow at Argenteuil.
And Train in snow at Argenteuil.

By other painters:

Argenteuil and Seine near Argenteuil by Édouard Manet, Regatta at Argenteuil by Pierre-Auguste Renoir, and The Bridge in Argenteuil by Gustave Caillebotte.

Gallery

See also

Communes of the Val-d'Oise department

References

External links

Official website 
Official facebook 
Association of Mayors of the Val d'Oise 

 
Communes of Val-d'Oise
Cities in Île-de-France
Subprefectures in France
Cities in France